John Hulle (died after 1403) was an English Member of Parliament.

He was a Member (MP) of the Parliament of England for Wilton in September 1388.

References

14th-century births
15th-century deaths
English MPs September 1388